Stillingia texana, the Texas toothleaf, is a species of flowering plant in the family Euphorbiaceae. It is native to the South Central United States and Mexico. In central Texas it is widespread in upland, calcareous prairies, spreading north to scattered locations in Oklahoma and south to Coahuila. Stillingia texana was described in 1923 by Ivan Murray Johnston.

References

texana
Plants described in 1923
Flora of the United States
Flora of Mexico